Simon Ross Harmer (born 10 February 1989) is a South African international cricketer. He plays for South Africa primarily as an off-break bowler but is also a capable lower order batsman. He plays domestic cricket for Titans.

Biography
Harmer debuted for Warriors in the 2010–2011 first class season against the Cape Cobras claiming 5/98 in the first innings and 1/53 in the second innings to go along with his 46 and 69 runs with the bat. He became a regular fixture in Warriors side in the 2011–2012 side, ending the season as leading wicket taker in his full rookie season, claiming 44 wickets.

These performances earned him a call up for the 3rd Test against West Indies in 2014/15, where he made his Test match debut for South Africa against the West Indies on 2 January 2015 at Newlands, Cape Town. He took his debut Test wicket by bowling Devon Smith in the last over before the lunch break on day one and ended the innings with figures of 3/71 from 26 overs.

Ahead of the 2017 season, Harmer signed for Essex County Cricket Club as a Kolpak player. In June, in the 2017 County Championship, Harmer took 9 wickets for 95 runs in the second innings against Middlesex. He was the first bowler for Essex to take nine wickets in an innings since Mark Ilott in 1995, and he finished with career-best match figures of 14 for 172.

Harmer continued his form and took the wicket which confirmed Essex as Champions in the win against Warwickshire. Harmer finished the 2017 season with the second-highest haul in the Country in terms of wickets taken, with 72 wickets at 19.19. Although neither he, nor his team, hit the same heights in 2018, he still managed 57 wickets at 24.45 each and provided useful runs batting at number eight in the batting order.

In October 2018, Harmer was named in Jozi Stars' squad for the first edition of the Mzansi Super League T20 tournament. He was the leading wicket-taker for Warriors in the 2018–19 CSA 4-Day Franchise Series, with 27 dismissals in seven matches. In September 2019, he was named in the squad for the Jozi Stars team for the 2019 Mzansi Super League tournament.

In September 2019, Harmer captained Essex County Cricket Club to their first ever T20 Blast victory against the Worcestershire County Cricket Club after taking 7 wickets across both the semi-final and final on Finals Day, the most by any bowler on a T20 English Domestic Finals Day. In April 2020 he was named as one of the Wisden Cricketers of the Year for his T20 and Championship performances for Essex in the 2019 season in the 2020 edition of Wisden Cricketers' Almanack.

In April 2021, Harmer was named in Northerns' squad, ahead of the 2021–22 cricket season in South Africa.

In January 2022, Harmer was named in the 17-man South Africa Test squad for their tour of New Zealand.

In April 2022, Harmer made his first appearance for the Proteas Test side in six and a half years against Bangladesh. He and Keshav Maharaj were instrumental in helping defeat Bangladesh 2–0 in the 2 test series, taking 13 wickets.

References

External links

Living people
1989 births
South African cricketers
South Africa Test cricketers
Warriors cricketers
Eastern Province cricketers
Border cricketers
Essex cricketers
Titans cricketers
Jozi Stars cricketers
Northerns cricketers
Durban's Super Giants cricketers
Cricketers from Pretoria
South African people of British descent
Wisden Cricketers of the Year